This is a list of Cornish people and others resident in Cornwall who are known for their work in geology or exploration.

Geologists

 William Borlase, naturalist, geologist and antiquary, Rector of Ludgvan
 Edward Budge, geologist and clergyman
 Elizabeth Carne, geologist and philanthropist
 Joseph Carne, geologist, industrialist and Fellow of the Royal Society
 Richard Edmonds, geologist and antiquary
 Robert Were Fox, FRS, geologist
 William Gregor, discoverer of titanium and clergyman
 John Hawkins, geologist, traveller and FRS
Robert Hunt, mineralogist and writer
 Matthew Paul Moyle, meteorologist and mining writer
Charles William Peach, naturalist and geologist
Benjamin Neeve Peach, geologist. 
 William Pengelly, geologist and archaeologist
 John Arthur Phillips, FRS, geologist, metallurgist, mining engineer

Explorers

 Richard Lander, explorer of Africa
 Samuel Wallis, explorer of the Pacific

References

 
Geology of Cornwall
Geologists